Abdul-Razzaq Sheikh Issa (born 1955) is the current president of Syrian Private University and a former Minister of Higher Education for Syria, serving from April 14, 2011 till June 23, 2012 .

Early life, education and career
Issa was born in Damascus in 1955.

PhD in the Physiology of Digestion, 1988
Diploma in Intensive Studies of Nutrition
Awarded the Order of Academic Palms from France
Secretary of Medicine Faculty, Damascus University, 1996-200
Assistant Higher Education Minister, 2006-2008

Personal life
Issa is married and has five children, two daughters and three sons.

See also
Cabinet of Syria

References

Minister of Higher Education Abdul-Razzaq Sheikh Issa, SANA
Biography of the new Syrian government 2011 - the names and lives of government ministers, Syria FM, 17 April 2011

External links
Ministry of Higher Education official government website
Undergraduate Admission official government website
 "Syrian Private University Website"

1955 births
Living people
Politicians from Damascus
University of Lyon alumni
Academic staff of Damascus University
Syrian ministers higher of education